David Livingstone Smith (born 26 September 1953) is professor of philosophy at the University of New England. He gained his MA at Antioch University and a Ph.D. in philosophy at the University of London (Kings College) where he worked on the philosophy of psychology. His  research interests include self-deception, dehumanization, human nature, ideology, race and moral psychology. He won the 2012 Anisfield-Wolf Book Award for non-fiction  and was a speaker at the 2012 G20 Economic Summit at Los Cabos, Mexico.

Publications
Freud's Philosophy of the Unconscious (Kluwer, 1999).
Approaching Psychoanalysis: An Introductory Course (Karnac, 1999).
Psychoanalysis in Focus (Sage, 2002).
Why We Lie: The Evolutionary Roots of Deception and the Unconscious Mind (St. Martin's Press, 2004).
The Most Dangerous Animal: Human Nature and the Origins of War (St. Martin's Press, 2007).
Less Than Human: Why We Demean, Enslave, and Exterminate Others (St. Martins Press, 2011).
"Beyond Good and Evil: Variations on Some Freudian Themes," in Bohart, A. et al. (eds.), Humanity’s Dark Side (APA Books, 2012).
"War, evolution, and the nature of human nature," in Shackleford, T. (ed.), Oxford Companion to Evolutionary Approaches to War and Violence (Oxford University Press, 2012).
"Indexically yours: why being human is more like being here than like being water," in Corby, R. H. A & Lanjouw, A. (eds.), The Politics of Species: Exploring the Species Interface (Cambridge University Press, 2013).
On Inhumanity: Dehumanization and How to Resist It (Oxford University Press, 2020).

See also 
Dehumanization
Ideology
Psychoanalysis

References

External links 
 David Livingstone Smith's website

Living people
1953 births
University of New England (United States) faculty
American philosophers
Antioch University alumni
Alumni of the University of London